Saturday Football International, or simply S.F.I., is a professional football club based in Taipei, Taiwan. They competed in the inaugural edition of the Taiwan Second Division Football League, and remains in the league, without ever being promoted to the first division.

Current squad

References

External links
 

Football clubs in Taiwan
2017 establishments in Taiwan
Association football clubs established in 2017
Sport in Taipei